The following is a list of episodes from the series Mike Tyson Mysteries.

Series overview

Episodes

Season 1 (2014–15)

Season 2 (2015–16)

Season 3 (2017–18)

Season 4 (2019–20)

Rating Graph

References 

Mike Tyson Mysteries